Bauxite School District 14  is a school district in Saline County, Arkansas, United States, headquartered in Bauxite.

Its area includes, in addition to most of Bauxite, sections of Benton, and Tull.

Academic performance
After years of trailing behind its more suburban counterparts in Saline County, Bauxite Public Schools have improved in recent years. Graduation rates rose over 7% from 2007–2010 to 97.2% with a dropout rate of 0.2%. The district expenditure per student as of 2010 was $7367, which, when matched with the state's per-pupil expenditure, totaled $15,675 spent per student in the district. In terms of teacher performance, 97% of all teachers in the district are completely certified, with 75.2% of instructors holding a bachelor's degree and the remaining 24.8% holding a master's degree.

Schools
 Bauxite High School
 Bauxite Middle School
 Pine Haven Elementary School
 Miner Academy (conversion charter school)

References

External links

 

Education in Saline County, Arkansas
School districts in Arkansas
Bauxite, Arkansas